The Re-Inventors is a Canadian TV show based around exploring historic inventions and testing them.  The show follows the hosts, Matt Hunter and Jeremy MacPherson, as they discover and reconstruct inventions to see how ideas from the past hold up in the present world. In each episode, the hosts choose a historic invention and attempt to rebuild it.  The hosts would examine the original patent information, including blueprints, then, along with additional tradesmen as needed, build the prototypes, and test each of these, often strange, inventions to see if any could actually succeed.  Often, a few related inventions would be tested in the same episode.  Each invention was given a set of evaluation criteria before being tested.  At the end of the episode, the invention was graded and if the invention was considered to have met the evaluation criteria, it was granted the title of 'Patent Approved'.  If the invention proved to be less than effective, it was granted the title 'Patent Denied'.

The TV series was developed by Christopher Triffo, CSC; he directed all 35 episodes.

The show was hosted by Matt Hunter and Jeremy MacPherson.  Matt Hunter is an artist and craftsman, and played the on-screen contractor on the Canadian lifestyle program Colour Confidenetial for 65 episodes prior to co-hosting The Re-Inventors. Jeremy MacPherson is a special effects artist and carpenter who has worked on hundreds of film and television productions, most notably X-Men, Chicago, Resident Evil: Apocalypse and K-19: The Widowmaker.

On History Television, two half-hour episodes were typically broadcast back-to-back in a one-hour time slot. It aired on the Canadian French TV channel Historia as Absurde et breveté and was dubbed into French.  The series is airing in over 60 countries in 30 languages and is currently running on Smithsonian Channel, Charge!, and H&I in the USA.  The first season was also released on Netflix USA on February 1, 2014.

List of episodes

Note: Episode listing is based on the two seasons that aired on the Smithsonian Channel.  The episodes from 2008-2009 were not shown on the Smithsonian Channel, and the show is no longer associated with or listed on the History Channel website, where the 2008-2009 episodes were aired.

Season 1 (2010)

Season 2 (2011)

Unlisted Episodes (2008–2009)

See also
 Ancient Discoveries
 Ancient Inventions
 MythBusters
 Patent Bending
 Prototype This!

References

2008 Canadian television series debuts
2011 Canadian television series endings
2010s Canadian documentary television series
2000s Canadian documentary television series
Television series by Corus Entertainment